Vira Misevych (10 April 1945 – 4 March 1995) was an equestrian from Soviet Union and Olympic champion. She won a gold medal in dressage with the Soviet team at the 1980 Summer Olympics in Moscow, which all competitive equestrian teams boycotted.

References

External links
Biography of Vira Misevich 
 

1945 births
1995 deaths
Ukrainian female equestrians
Soviet female equestrians
Ukrainian dressage riders
Olympic equestrians of the Soviet Union
Olympic gold medalists for the Soviet Union
Equestrians at the 1980 Summer Olympics
Sportspeople from Kyiv
Olympic medalists in equestrian
Medalists at the 1980 Summer Olympics
Honoured Masters of Sport of the USSR